Colleen Fitzpatrick may refer to:

 Colleen Ann Fitzpatrick (born 1972), American pop singer known as Vitamin C
 Colleen Anne Fitzpatrick (1938–2017), Australian model, actress and filmmaker
 Colleen M. Fitzpatrick (born 1955), American forensic genealogist

See also 
 Fitzpatrick (surname)
 Fitzpatrick (disambiguation)